The Cape Pallarenda Conservation Park is a protected conservation park located  north-east of Townsville in the Far North region of Queensland, Australia. The  regional park is located within the suburb of Pallarenda.

Attractions
There are several walking tracks on Cape Pallarenda. One of them passes two Second World War searchlight emplacements, and leads to the isolated and scenic Shelley Beach. Another path leads to a moving graveyard and memorial for 13 Vietnamese immigrants who died in August 1920 during a meningitis outbreak while interned at the former Cape Pallarenda Quarantine Station.

Pallarenda Park also has a boat ramp that provides direct access to the beach, and a permanent stinger enclosure for swimming.

History
Cape Pallarenda was named in 1864 by Lieutenant George Poynter Heath during his survey of Cleveland Bay. It is believed that the name is of Aboriginal origin, although the exact meaning is not known.

Pallarenda Park was transformed during World War II into a military hospital. The 500 bed, 2/14 Army General Hospital scattered along the sandy foreshore at Pallarenda received many casualties, most from New Guinea.

Controversy
Consideration is being given to a housing development within the park boundaries, which has been met by opposition by local residents.

See also

 Protected areas of Queensland

References

External links

Conservation parks of Queensland
Townsville
Queensland in World War II